Richard Earl D'Agostin, was an American rock and roll musician best known for touring with Eddie Cochran. D'Agostin sang and played piano and guitar as the front man for The Swingers, composed of drummer Gene Riggio, lead guitar Dave Oster, saxophonist Paul Kaufman, bassist Wayne Messick, and D'Agostin's brother Larry D'Agostin on guitar. While all the Swingers were also accomplished dancers, D'Agostin and his partner Judi Stein were the 1955 Al Jarvis dance champions, topping thousands of competitors. He also edited dance columns for two of the first teen magazines, Dig and Modern Teen.

Film Appearances
 Earth vs. the Spider (aka The Spider) (1958)
 Hot Rod Gang (aka Fury Unleashed) (1958)
 Eighteen and Anxious (1957)

Audio

External links
 Rockin' Country Style Discography

References

American rock musicians
American rockabilly musicians
American bandleaders
1993 deaths
1936 births
20th-century American musicians